Look at Us is an album by Sonny & Cher.

Look at Us may also refer to:
 "Look at Us" (Vince Gill song), from the album Pocket Full of Gold
 "Look at Us" (Craig Morgan song), from the album I Love It
 "Look at Us" (Sarina Paris song), from the album Sarina Paris

See also
 Turn Around, Look at Us, album by the Bee Gees
 "Look at Us Now", song by Lost Kings
 Look at Me (disambiguation)
 Look at You (disambiguation)